Petr Zelenka may refer to:
 Petr Zelenka (director)
 Petr Zelenka (serial killer)